Youssef Osama Nabih (born 7 September 2000) is an Egyptian professional footballer who plays as a forward for Egyptian Premier League club Zamalek.

References

Egyptian footballers
Living people
2000 births
Zamalek SC players